Jind Assembly constituency is one of the 90 assembly constituencies of Haryana a northern state of India. Jind is also part of Sonipat Lok Sabha constituency.

Members of Legislative Assembly
 1967: Daya Krishan, Indian National Congress
 1968: Daya Krishan, Indian National Congress
 1972: Dal Singh, Indian National Congress (Organisation)
 1977: Mange Ram Gupta, Independent
 1987: Brij Mohan, Lok Dal
 1991: Parma Nand, Lok Dal
 1996: Mange Ram Gupta, Indian National Congress
 1996: Brij Mohan, Haryana Vikas Party
 2000: Mange Ram Gupta, Indian National Congress
 2005: Mange Ram Gupta, Indian National Congress
 2009: Dr. Hari Chand Middha, Indian National Lok Dal
 2014: Dr. Hari Chand Middha, Indian National Lok Dal
 2019 (by-election): Krishan Lal Middha, Bharatiya Janata Party
 2019 : Krishan Lal Middha, Bharatiya Janata Party

Election results

2019

2019 Bypoll

See also
 Jhajjar
 List of constituencies of the Haryana Legislative Assembly

References

External links

Assembly constituencies of Haryana
Jind